Scott Shepherd (born 29 May 1996) is a Scottish footballer who plays as a forward for Scottish League Two club East Fife. Shepherd has previously played for Falkirk, Stirling Albion, Brechin City, Edinburgh City and Forfar Athletic

Career
Born in Perth, Shepherd began his career with Falkirk. He was first included in a matchday squad on 20 August 2013, in a Scottish Challenge Cup second round match at Ayr United, coming on in the 96th minute for Thomas Grant and heading the winner in a 2–1 win. He made his professional debut four days later in a 0–3 Scottish Championship win at Livingston, replacing hat-trick scorer Philip Roberts for the final 22 minutes. On 23 November, he came on as an 85th-minute substitute for Rory Loy, and two minutes later scored his first league goal to conclude a 4–0 home win over Cowdenbeath.

On 2 August 2014, Shepherd scored four minutes after replacing Botti Biabi to conclude a 3–1 comeback win at Montrose in the first round of the Scottish Challenge Cup. From 8 January to 28 March 2015, Shepherd was loaned to Stirling Albion, where he made eight Scottish League One appearances. In January 2016, he joined Scottish League One side Brechin City on loan until the end of the season. After scoring once in eight appearances for the Glebe Park side, Shepherd returned to Falkirk at the end of March.

Shepherd was loaned to Edinburgh City in November 2017, with the move subsequently being extended until the end of the 2017–18 season. Shepherd moved to Edinburgh City on a permanent basis in August 2018. 

On 4th July 2020, Shepherd signed for Forfar Athletic where he scored seven goals in two seasons at Station Park.

Shepherd joined fellow Scottish League Two side East Fife on a one-year contract from 24th May 2022.

References

External links

1996 births
Living people
Footballers from Perth, Scotland
Scottish footballers
Association football forwards
Falkirk F.C. players
Stirling Albion F.C. players
Brechin City F.C. players
Scottish Professional Football League players
F.C. Edinburgh players
Forfar Athletic F.C. players
East Fife F.C. players